West Carlisle is an unincorporated community in Pike Township, Coshocton County, Ohio, United States.

History
West Carlisle was laid out in 1821. The community most likely derived its name from Carlisle, Pennsylvania, the birthplace of a first settler. A post office was established at West Carlisle in 1822, and remained in operation until 1932.

References

Unincorporated communities in Coshocton County, Ohio
1821 establishments in Ohio
Populated places established in 1821
Unincorporated communities in Ohio